Michael Conde McGinley (October 13, 1890 – July 2, 1963) was the editor of a semi-monthly paper called Common Sense who received US-wide attention for a brief period due to his campaign against the nomination of Anna M. Rosenberg as assistant secretary of Defense in the administration of President Harry S. Truman. This campaign led to an investigation by the House Un-American Activities Committee.

Early life
Born in Norman, Oklahoma, the eldest of three surviving children of Irish Catholic immigrant Connell B. McGinley (1852 – 1941) and his wife, Catherine. McGinley preferred to be known by his middle name Conde. He married Celia Brown around 1918. Around this time he claimed that he was "Secretary of the Grady County Highway Association" in Chickasha, Oklahoma. He moved with his parents to the Dallas, Texas area, where his daughter Nona was born in 1927, and where his father died in 1941.

Career

Common Sense
McGinley moved to New Jersey in 1929, opening a chain of restaurants along the shore. During World War II, he worked as an inspector in a defense plant. In 1946, he began editing a weekly paper in Newark, New Jersey called variously Think, The Think and Think Weekly. By June 1947, it was issued as Common Sense. In November 1947, the headquarters were transferred to Union Township, Union County, New Jersey. The paper became semi-monthly in 1948.

Although the first issues were anti-Communist, it later developed into a mostly anti-Semitic broadsheet, produced by himself, with his son and daughter-in-law. Around 1948, he sued America magazine and others (including Walter Winchell) for libel, and the case dragged on for about seven years.

In one issue of 1948, a major part of the paper was taken up by support for Robert Best, who had been convicted of treason (broadcasting Nazi propaganda from Germany during World War II). In the July and August 1949 issues, W. Henry MacFarland Jr.'s name appears as associate editor. "At the time Conde was planning to combine forces with MacFarland's Nationalist Action League, as well as with the Loyal American Group, headed by William J. O'Brien."  O'Brien later joined the paper's staff.

The paper carried articles by Eustace Mullins starting September 1951. In 1953, he became a writer on staff. In addition, articles were written by Frederick C. F. Weiss, Kurt Mertig (founder of the National Renaissance Party), Elizabeth Dilling, Lyrl Clark Van Hyning, Gen. George Van Horn Moseley, Col. Eugene N. Sanctuary and Charles B. Hudson. Circulation, at its height, averaged 50,000 copies.

The paper's contributor, Col. Eugene Sanctuary, had, among other things, written a pamphlet, Is the New Deal Communist?, in which he made a 35-point comparison of The New Deal to Karl Marx's 1848 program. He also wrote an editor's note in I. B. Pranaitis' The Talmud Unmasked: The Secret Rabbinical Teachings Concerning Christians (1939).

Involvement with the House Un-American Activities Committee
At the confirmation hearings for Anna Rosenberg, McGinley and others associated with him were prominently figured, including Benjamin H. Freedman, who had partially financed Common Sense. The fallout of this dispute brought him into the sights of House Un-American Activities Committee, which issued a 1954 report condemning his propaganda.:

In response, "Conde McGinley of Common Sense urged the committee to hold a public hearing and 'if we cannot prove our statements we'll be very willing to cease publication'."

Christian Education Association
In 1954, McGinley formed the Christian Education Association with himself as president, his son as secretary/treasurer and Alex Jefimow as vice-president. The operation was at 530 Chestnut Street in Union, a building owned by Katherine Lettig, who was also a volunteer for the paper. The group also operated the Union Patriotic Press, whose officers were Charles Kane, John J. Reynolds and Edward J. Byrne.

In 1955, he was sued for $250,000 in punitive damages, for libel, by Rabbi Joachim Prinz (1902-1988) in Superior Court in Newark, New Jersey. McGinley had published that Prinz was "expelled in 1937 from Germany for revolutionary communistic activities". McGinley was defended by three attorneys, including Albert Dilling, former husband of Elizabeth Dilling Stokes, and their son, Kirkpatrick Dilling. The jury awarded Prinz $30,000, agreeing that "the biweekly publication was lying when it characterized him as a 'Red Rabbi'".

Death
McGinley died July 2, 1963 at his home in Union, New Jersey, aged 72. He was survived by his wife, two sons, and two daughters.

Closure of Common Sense
In a display ad in The New York Times on June 16, 1972, it is stated that although Common Sense had a May issue, it is "now defunct".

The magazine National Vanguard claimed that:

Footnotes

References

1900-1930 Federal U.S. Census
World War I Draft Registration Card
Texas Birth Index, Texas Death Index
Preliminary Report on Neo-Fascist and Hate Groups  (PDF file, 3 Meg), Committee on Un-American Activities, U.S. House of Representatives, Washington, D.C. 1954

Further reading
Biography Index. A cumulative index to biographical material in books and magazines. Volume 6: September, 1961-August, 1964. New York: H.W. Wilson Co., 1965. (BioIn 6)
Epstein, B., Forster, A. The Radical Right, 1967 (104)
Forster, A., Epstein, B. Danger on the Right, 1964 (35)
Heidenry, J., Theirs Was the Kingdom, 1993 (210)
Nikitin, V. The Ultras in the USA, 1981 (144)

External links
 
Rev Lafarge's papers at Georgetown University
America magazine archives at Georgetown University
Conde McGinley's FBI files, obtained under the FOIA and hosted at the Internet Archive

NYC office files part 1
NYC office files part 1A
NYC office files part 2
NYC office files part 2A
NYC office files part 3
Newark, NJ office files part 1
Newark, NJ office files part 1A
Newark, NJ office files part 1-1
Newark, NJ office files part 1-2
Newark, NJ office files part 1-3
Newark, NJ office files part 2
Newark, NJ office files part 3
Newark, NJ office files part 3-1
Newark, NJ office files part 4

1890 births
1963 deaths
American publishers (people)
American conspiracy theorists
American people of Irish descent
People from Dallas
People from Norman, Oklahoma
People from Union Township, Union County, New Jersey
Old Right (United States)
American anti-communists